Deltex E3 ubiquitin ligase 3L is a protein that in humans is encoded by the DTX3L gene.

Function

DTX3L functions as an E3 ubiquitin ligase (Takeyama et al., 2003 [PubMed 12670957]).

References

Further reading